The Sri Lankan national cricket team toured Australia and New Zealand in February and March 1983 and played a two-match Test series against the New Zealand national cricket team. New Zealand won the series 2–0. New Zealand were captained by Geoff Howarth and Sri Lanka by Somachandra de Silva. In addition, the teams played a three-match series of Limited Overs Internationals (LOI) which New Zealand won 3–0. The Australian leg of the tour consisted of two first-class matches but no Tests.

One Day Internationals (ODIs)

New Zealand won the Rothmans Cup 3-0.

1st ODI

2nd ODI

3rd ODI

Test series summary

First Test

Second Test

References

External links

1982–83 Australian cricket season
1983 in Australian cricket
1983 in New Zealand cricket
1983 in Sri Lankan cricket
International cricket competitions from 1980–81 to 1985
New Zealand cricket seasons from 1970–71 to 1999–2000
1983
1983